Yainer Radhames Díaz (born September 21, 1998) is a Dominican professional baseball catcher for the Houston Astros of Major League Baseball (MLB).

From Azua, Dominican Republic, Díaz signed with the Cleveland Indians as an international free agent in 2016.  In 2021, he was traded to the Astros, with whom he made his MLB debut in 2022.

Professional career
Yainer Díaz signed with the Cleveland Indians as an international free agent in December 2016.  On July 30, 2021, the Indians traded him along with relief pitcher Phil Maton to the Houston Astros for outfielder Myles Straw.

Díaz was promoted to the Triple-A Sugar Land Space Cowboys for the 2022 season, batting .306 with an .898 on-base plus slugging percentage (OPS) in 486 plate appearances.  He was a 2022 All-Star Futures Game selectee.  Díaz hit a three-run home run on August 19, 2022, in the sixth inning of the second game a doubleheader versus the Oklahoma City Dodgers in which the Space Cowboys scored 17 runs  to set a franchise record.

The Astros called Díaz up to the major league roster on September 1, 2022.  He made his major league debut on September 2, 2022, starting as the designated hitter versus the Los Angeles Angels  at Angel Stadium.  He was 0-for-3 with a bases loaded walk for his first run batted in (RBI).  He got his first hit, a double, against Javy Guerra of the Tampa Bay Rays in the eighth inning on September 20.  Following the regular season, Díaz was named the Houston Astros' Minor League Player of the Year.

See also
 List of Major League Baseball players from the Dominican Republic

References

External links

1998 births
Living people
Major League Baseball players from the Dominican Republic
Dominican Republic expatriate baseball players in the United States
Major League Baseball catchers
Houston Astros players
Dominican Summer League Indians players
Arizona League Indians players
Mahoning Valley Scrappers players
Lynchburg Hillcats players
Fayetteville Woodpeckers players
Asheville Tourists players
Corpus Christi Hooks players
Sugar Land Space Cowboys players
Leones del Escogido players